Andrés Felipe Tello Muñoz (born 6 September 1996) is a Colombian footballer who currently plays as a midfielder for Benevento.

Club career

Envigado
Tello began in the lower youth squads of Envigado. Thanks to his good performances, Tello would play with the senior team of Envigado, debuting at age 17 against Independiente Medellín on 10 April 2014. Andrés Tello played 16 times in his debut season and scored twice; thanks to his performance, many European teams wanted him to join their ranks, among them teams like Juventus and Cagliari in Italy.

Juventus 
During the 2015 Winter Transfer window, Serie A giants Juventus took Tello on a season-long loan for 1 million, with an option to buy him at €1.4m. Juventus would then purchase Tello after making 7 appearances with their youth squad. On 8 August 2015, Tello was an unused substitute when Juventus won the Supercoppa Italiana against Lazio.

Loan to Cagliari 
On 19 August 2015, Tello was signed by Serie B side Cagliari on a season-long loan deal. On 11 October he made his Serie B debut for Cagliari as a substitute replacing Diego Farias in the 78th minute of a 3–1 home win over Cesena. On 27 October, Tello played his first match as starter for Cagliari, a 0–0 away draw against Perugia; he was replaced by Marco Fossati in the 78th minute. On 15 November he played his first entire match for Cagliari, a 3–1 away win over Spezia. On 3 December, Tello played in the fourth round of Coppa Italia in a 1–0 away win over Sassuolo. On 9 December he scored his first goal for Cagliari in the 13th minute of a 3–1 away win over Virus Lanciano. On 15 December he played in a 3–0 away defeat against Internazionale in the quarter-finals of Coppa Italia. On 24 December he scored his second goal, as a substitute, in the 84th minute, but he was sent off with a red card in the 86th minute of a 2–0 away win over Salernitana. Tello ended his loan to Cagliari with 26 appearances and 2 goals.

Loan to Empoli 
On 4 July 2016, Tello was signed by Serie A club Empoli on a season-long loan deal. On 13 August he made his debut for Empoli in a 2–0 home win over Vicenza in the third round of Coppa Italia; he played the entire match. On 21 October, Tello made his Serie A debut for Empoli in a 1–0 home defeat against Sampdoria; he was replaced by Rade Krunić in the 46th minute. On 12 September he played his first entire match for Empoli, a 2–1 home win over Crotone. On 29 November he played the fourth round of Coppa Italia in a 2–1 home defeat, after extra time, against Cesena. Tello ended his season-long loan to Empoli with 20 appearances.

Loan to Bari 
On 18 July 2017, Tello was loaned to Serie B side Bari on a season-long loan deal. On 6 August he made his debut for Bari in a 2–1 home win over Parma in the second round of Coppa Italia; he played the entire match. On 12 August he played in the third round in a 2–1 home win over Cremonese. On 28 August, Tello made his Serie B debut for Bari in a 3–0 home win over Cesena; he played the entire match. On 3 September he scored his first goal for Bari in the 42nd minute of a 3–2 away defeat against Empoli. Tello ended his loan to Bari with 36 appearances and 1 goal.

Benevento
On 13 July 2018, Tello signed a contract until 30 June 2021 with Benevento, with a option to rebuy for Juventus.

Style of play 
Tello is right footed and has a good physical structure that allows him to fight in midfield. He is usually keen to run without the ball and, in the change of pace, he has technical characteristics for which, at home, he is compared to Juan Cuadrado.

Career statistics

International career

U20 national team
Tello made his debut in the 2014 Toulon Tournament, appearing in 3 matches. Tello was recalled to the U20 squad at the 2015 South American Youth Football Championship, playing in all matches and helping Colombia finish as runners-up.

Honours
Juventus
 Supercoppa Italiana: 2015

References

External links

1996 births
Living people
Association football midfielders
Colombian footballers
Footballers from Medellín
Colombia under-20 international footballers
Colombia youth international footballers
Categoría Primera A players
Serie A players
Serie B players
Envigado F.C. players
Cagliari Calcio players
Empoli F.C. players
S.S.C. Bari players
Benevento Calcio players
Colombian expatriate footballers
Expatriate footballers in Italy
2015 South American Youth Football Championship players